"Treasure of Logic on Valid Cognition" (sanskr. Subhashitaratnanidhi) is an aphoristic tractate that is considered to be dogmatic. It was written in the beginning of the 13th century by Tibetan spiritual leader and Buddhist scholar Sakya Pandita. One of the most popular tractates in medieval Tibet and Mongolia.

Structure of tractate
Treasure of Logic on Valid Cognition consists of 457 poetic aphorisms divided into 9 chapters by thematic features:
 Reflections about wise people (1–30)
 Reflections about noble people (31–58)
 Reflections about ignorant people (59–101)
 Reflections of plural character (102–144)
 Reflections about misconduct (145–192)
 Reflections about natural behavior (193–256)
 Reflections about inappropriate behavior (257–303)
 Reflections about deeds (304–398)
 Reflections about Dharma (399–457)

Translations
 United Kingdom 1856 – English translation by Sándor Csoma de Kőrös
 France 1858 – French translation by Philippe Édouard Foucaux
 Germany 1926 – Germany translation by V.Campbell
 China 1958 – Chinese translation by Wan Yao

References

Tibetan Buddhist texts